Zeno Hackl (16 July 1912 in Dubrovnik – 14 May 1992 in Mostar) was a Yugoslav actor.

Biography
After finishing Elementary and Secondary school in Mostar he moved to Zagreb to study acting in, which was then called a "State Acting School" (1931–34). Later it changed the name to the "Academy of Performing Arts". In 1934 he went to Vienna for further education in theatre and acting from 1934 to 1936.
He was back in Mostar in 1936 and became an active member of "Hrvoje" theatre where he performed as an actor and director (1936–49).

Zeno Hackl was one of the founders of a "National Theater of Mostar", which was established in 1949.

His varied career included theatre, television, film, as well as directing (1936–82)

Zeno Hackl, the theatre doyen and one of the founders of the Mostar National Theater was 2014 honoured posthumously and presented with a Plaque for life's work, commitment, art and contribution to theatre art as part of the celebration of the 65th anniversary of the Mostar National Theater.

Filmography 
 Crni Biseri (1958)
 Radopolje (1963)
 Horoskop (1969)

References 

20th-century Croatian male actors
Yugoslav male stage actors

1912 births
1992 deaths
Yugoslav male stage actors